Presidential elections were held in Guatemala in July 1904. The result was a victory for Manuel Estrada Cabrera, who received all but three of the valid votes. He assumed the presidency on 15 March 1905.

Results

Bibliography
Villagrán Kramer, Francisco. Biografía política de Guatemala: años de guerra y años de paz. FLACSO-Guatemala, 2004.
González Davison, Fernando. El régimen Liberal en Guatemala (1871–1944). Guatemala: Universidad de San Carlos de Guatemala. 1987.
Dosal, Paul J. Power in transition: the rise of Guatemala's industrial oligarchy, 1871–1994. Westport: Praeger. 1995.
Holden, Robert H. Armies without nations: public violence and state formation in Central America, 1821–1960. New York: Oxford University Press. 2004.
Taracena Arriola, Arturo. "Liberalismo y poder político en Centroamérica (1870–1929).” Historia general de Centroamérica . 1994. San José: FLACSO. Volume 4.
Rendón, Catherine. "El gobierno de Manuel Estrada Cabrera". Historia general de Guatemala. 1993–1999. Guatemala: Asociación de Amigos del País, Fundación para la Cultura y el Desarrollo. Volume 5. 1996.

Presidential elections in Guatemala
Guatemala
1904 in Guatemala
July 1904 events
Election and referendum articles with incomplete results
One-party elections